Muijin (also Romanized as Mū’ījīn and Moo’ijin; also known as Hū’ī Jīn, Marījīn, Mū’īn, and Mū’jīn) is a village in Alvandkuh-e Gharbi Rural District, in the Central District of Hamadan County, Hamadan Province, Iran. At the 2006 census, its population was 1,759, in 434 families.

References 

Populated places in Hamadan County